Year 1362 (MCCCLXII) was a common year starting on Saturday (link will display the full calendar) of the Julian calendar.

Events 
 January–December 
 January 1 – The Grand Duchy of Lithuania switches New Year to January 1, before any other country does.
 January 16 – The "Grote Mandrenke" storm tide strikes the Netherlands, England, Germany and Denmark, destroying the Danish settlement of Rungholt in the Duchy of Schleswig, and the Humber estuary port of Ravenser Odd in England. The East Frisian island of Buise is broken into two by North Sea floods.
 February 15 – King Haakon VI of Norway, son of Magnus IV of Sweden, proclaims himself king of Sweden in opposition to his father. However, later in the year, father and son are reconciled and rule Sweden together.
 March – Murad I succeeds his father Orhan as sultan of the Ottoman Empire.
 April – Muhammed V, Sultan of Granada, returns to the throne after the murder of the usurper Muhammed VI.
 April 6 – Battle of Brignais: The Free Companies defeat a French army.
 April 6 – A fire destroys much of St Patrick's Cathedral in Dublin.
 April 17 – Kaunas Castle falls to the Teutonic Order, after a month-long siege.
 June – Under the terms of the will of Sir John de Wingfield (died 1361), the church of St. Andrew and a college of priests are founded in Wingfield, Suffolk, England.
 June 22 – An alliance is formed between England and Castile.
 July 8 – Valdemar IV of Denmark defeats the Hanseatic League in the naval Battle of Helsingborg.
 September 28 – Pope Urban V succeeds Pope Innocent VI, as the 200th pope.
 October 13 –  The Chancellor of England for the first time opens Parliament with a speech in English.  Under Edward III of England, the Pleading in English Act makes English rather than Law French the official language in law courts.
 November – Lionel of Antwerp, son of King Edward III of England, is created Duke of Clarence.
 December 21 – Constantine IV succeeds his cousin, Constantine III, as King of Armenia.

 Date unknown 
 Autumn 1362 or 1363 – Battle of Blue Waters: Grand Duke of Lithuania Algirdas defeats the Tatars, and takes over Kiev.
 Louis I of Hungary defeats and captures Ivan Sratsimir of Bulgaria, and conquers northern Bulgaria, extending his control over the Balkans.
 The Ottomans capture Philippopolis and Adrianopole (the modern-day city of Edirne) from the Byzantine Empire, reducing its territory to the city of Constantinople, part of the Peloponessus, and some islands.
 Shahabuddin succeeds his brother, Alauddin Ali Sher, as Sultan of Kashmir.
 The Öræfajökull volcano erupts in Iceland, resulting in the destruction of the district of Litlahérað by flood and tephra fall.
 The English Hospice of the Most Holy Trinity and St Thomas is founded in Rome. It goes on to become the English College, a centre for training English priests in Rome.
 Purported date of the inscription of the Kensington Runestone, at Solem, Minnesota.

Births 
 January 16 – Robert de Vere, Duke of Ireland (d. 1392)
 date unknown – Murdoch Stewart, 2nd Duke of Albany (d. 1425)
 Empress Xu (Ming dynasty) of China  (d. 1407)
 probable – Wang Fu, Chinese painter (d. 1416)
 date unknown – Adolf I, Count of Nassau-Siegen (d. 1420)

Deaths 
 March – Orhan, Ottoman sultan (b. 1281)
 April 6 – James I, Count of La Marche, French soldier (b. 1319)
 April 10 – Maud, Countess of Leicester (b. 1339)
 May 26 – Louis of Taranto (b. 1320)
 July 11 – Anna von Schweidnitz, empress of Charles IV (b. 1339) (childbirth)
 July 22 – Louis of Durazzo, Italian soldier (poisoned) (b. 1324)
 September 7 – Joan of The Tower, Queen consort of king David II of Scotland (b. 1321)
 September 12 – Pope Innocent VI (b. 1282 or 1295)
 December 10 – Frederick III, Duke of Austria, second son of Duke Albert II of Austria (b. 1347)
 December 21 – Constantine III, King of Armenia (b. 1313)
 date unknown – Emperor John of Trebizond

References